Darren Forssman (born 14 September 1970) is a former Australian rules footballer who played with Geelong in the Australian Football League (AFL).

A utility, Geelong recruited Forssman from Colac. Forssman made 15 appearances in the 1992 AFL season, but an ankle cost him a chance of playing in that year's grand final.

Forssman has coached Geelong Football League clubs Colac, Geelong West St Peters and assistant coach of the Geelong West Giants Senior women’s team, alongside Steve Toohey.

References

1970 births
Australian rules footballers from Victoria (Australia)
Geelong Football Club players
Colac Football Club players
Living people